UNCA may refer to:

 United Nations Correspondents Association
 University of North Carolina at Asheville
 United Neighborhood Centers of America

See also 
 Uncas (disambiguation)